An Hảo is a rural commune (xã) and village of the Tịnh Biên District of An Giang Province, Vietnam.
Núi Cấm (the forbidden mountain), also known as Thiên Cấm Sơn is a famous mountain in An Hảo commune.

References

Communes of An Giang province
Populated places in An Giang province